Cody Mandell (born April 7, 1992)  is an American football punter for the Hamilton Tiger-Cats of the Canadian Football League (CFL). Mandell played his college football at Alabama.

Early years
Mandell attended Acadiana High School and was recruited to Alabama to walk-on the team as a punter. During his career with the Crimson Tide, Mandell started all four years and was a member of both the 2011 and 2012 national championship teams. During his four years at Alabama, he increased his punting average from 39.2 yards as a freshman to 47.1 yards by his senior year.

Professional career

Dallas Cowboys
After his senior year at Alabama, Mandell was selected to participate in the NFL Scouting Combine as one of the top punters in the 2014 draft class. Mandell went undrafted in the 2014 NFL Draft, but was signed as an undrafted free agent by the Dallas Cowboys after the draft. He was released on August 12, 2014.

Green Bay Packers
On January 26, 2015, it was announced by Green Bay Packers General Manager Ted Thompson that they signed Mandell and that he would wear number 9 for the Packers. He was released from the team on August 10, 2015.

References

External links
Alabama Crimson Tide bio

Living people
Alabama Crimson Tide football players
American football punters
Dallas Cowboys players
Players of American football from Louisiana
Sportspeople from Lafayette, Louisiana
1992 births